The 2018 IAAF World Indoor Tour was the third edition of the IAAF World Indoor Tour,  the highest series of international track and field indoor meetings. It was designed to create an IAAF Diamond League-style circuit for indoor track and field events, to raise the profile of indoor track and field athletics.

The Tour had six events for 2018, five in Europe and one in the United States, leading to the 2018 IAAF World Indoor Championships in Birmingham, United Kingdom. Winners of the Tour enjoyed similar privileges in relation to World Indoor Championships qualification as Diamond League winners do in relation to World Championships in Athletics.  This was the first edition of the tour that featured the Madrid Indoor Meeting. The five 2017 meetings returned, although the Birmingham Indoor Grand Prix once more, as in 2016, moved to Glasgow as part of a long term deal, accommodating the hosting of the 2018 IAAF World Indoor Championships in Birmingham.

Meetings 
For the 2018 edition, the Meeting Madrid was added. In addition, as part of a long term agreement alternating venues of the Great Britain leg, the Birmingham Grand Prix moved to Glasgow, Scotland, facilitating the hosting of the 2018 IAAF World Indoor Championships in Birmingham.

Scoring system
At each meeting a minimum of 12 events were staged. Included in the 12 events will be a core group of five or six events split across the two-season cycle.

Tour events for 2016 were the men’s 60m, 800m, 3000/5000m, pole vault, triple jump and shot put, plus the women’s 400m, 1500m, 60m hurdles, high jump and long jump.

Points were allocated to the best four athletes in each event, with the winner getting 10 points, the runner up receiving seven points, the third-placed finisher getting five points and the athlete in fourth receiving three points.

The individual overall winner of each event received US $20,000 in prize money and automatically qualified for the 2018 edition of the IAAF World Indoor Championships as a ‘wild card’ entry, provided the member federation of that World Indoor Tour winner agreed to enter the athlete.

Men

 60 metres
 800 metres
 3000 metres
 Pole vault
 Triple jump
 Shot put

 Women

 400 metres
 1500 metres
 60 metre hurdles
 High jump
 Long jump

Results

Men's track

Men's field

Women's track

Women's field

Final 2018 World Indoor Tour standings

Men

Women

References

World Athletics Indoor Tour
IAAF World Indoor Tour